The  season is the 48th season of the second-tier club football in Japan and the 21st season since the establishment of J2 League.

Clubs

After eight seasons of good success, Kashiwa Reysol had to say goodbye to the first division. The same happened to V-Varen Nagasaki, which came back to J2 after their debut season in the first tier. In their place, Matsumoto Yamaga and Oita Trinita left J2 after getting promoted, while Tokyo Verdy lost the promotion/relegation play-off against Jubilo Iwata. Also another four teams changed category: Roasso Kumamoto and Kamatamare Sanuki left J2, while their places will be taken by newly-arrived FC Ryukyu and Kagoshima United FC will play their first J2-season ever in their history.

The participating clubs are listed in the following table:

Personnel and kits

Managerial changes

Foreign players
The total number of foreign players is limitless, but clubs can only register up to five foreign players for a single match-day squad. Players from J.League partner nations (Thailand, Vietnam, Myanmar, Malaysia, Cambodia, Singapore, Iran and Qatar) are exempt from these restrictions.

Players in bold are players who join midway through the competition.

League table

Positions by round

Promotion–Relegation Playoffs

In the first two rounds of the 2019 J.League J1/J2 Play-Offs (2019 J1参入プレーオフ), if the score is tied after 90 minutes, no extra time is played and the winner is the team with the best J2 League ranking. In the final match against the J1 team, if the score is tied after 90 minutes, no extra time is played and the J1 team wins.

1st round

2nd round

Final

Shonan Bellmare remains in J1 League.Tokushima Vortis remains in J2 League.

Top scorers
.

Attendances

Notes

References

J2 League seasons
2
Japan